The Manassas Line is a Virginia Railway Express commuter line that extends from Washington, D.C. to Bristow, Virginia. The first of VRE's two lines, with service beginning on June 22, 1992, the line operates on tracks owned by CSX Transportation (the RF&P Subdivision) and Norfolk Southern Railway (the Washington District).

History
The line south of Alexandria, Virginia, was once owned by Southern Railway, whose Crescent train stopped at the line's Alexandria and  stations.

In 1984, planning began for a commuter rail service for the area. Eight years later, after many new stations were constructed, Virginia Railway Express began operating trains on the line on June 22, 1992.

In 2017, VRE began a $2.8 million study of expansion to the Broad Run station and layover facility that would allow additional Manassas Line service.

Stations list

References

See also
 Fredericksburg Line

Rail infrastructure in Virginia
Rail infrastructure in Washington, D.C.
1992 establishments in Virginia